Troupe may refer to:

General
Comedy troupe, a group of comedians
Dance troupe, a group of dancers
Fire troupe, a group of fire dancers
Troupe system, a method of playing role-playing games
Theatrical troupe, a group of theatrical performers

People with the surname Troupe
Ben Troupe (born 1982), American football player
Quincy Troupe (born 1939), American poet and journalist
Ron Troupe, a fictional journalist in the Superman comics
Tom Troupe (born 1928), American actor and journalist

See also
List of dance companies
List of improvisational theatre companies
 Troup (disambiguation)